Alfred Darlington (born Alfred Weisberg-Roberts, October 31, 1977), better known by their stage name Daedelus, is an American record producer based in Los Angeles, California. They are a part of the groups The Long Lost and Adventure Time. They are affiliated with the internet radio station Dublab.

Early life
Daedelus attended the University of Southern California Thornton School of Music studying Jazz on Double Bass.

Career
A teenage obsession with Greek mythology led them to adopt the stage name Daedelus—a tribute to the artist, inventor, and craftsman (spelled Daedalus).

In 1999 they began DJing Dublab.com's Entropy Sessions and releasing their own early demo productions. This got the attention of Carlos Niño (of Ammoncontact), who featured Daedelus tracks on two compilations. Subsequently, Daedelus released a studio album, Invention, on Plug Research in 2002. The Household EP was released on Eastern Developments in 2003. They also released The Weather, a collaborative album with Busdriver and Radioinactive, on Mush Records that year.

They released a studio album, Of Snowdonia, on Plug Research in 2004. It was followed by another solo album, A Gent Agent, on Laboratory Instinct that year.

Their 2005 album, Exquisite Corpse, featured guest appearances from MF Doom, Mike Ladd, and TTC. In the following year, they released Denies the Day's Demise on Mush Records.

Their 2008 album, Love to Make Music To, and 2011 album, Bespoke, were both released on Ninja Tune. They released the Righteous Fists of Harmony EP in 2010, and The Light Brigade in 2014. In 2013, they released a studio album, Drown Out, on Anticon. In 2015, they participated in the musical transmedia Soundhunters broadcast on the Franco-German channel Arte. In 2016, they released Labyrinths. 

In 2019, they became a faculty member of the Berklee Electronic Production and Design Department. 

In 2020, they were named an Artist In Residence at SETI.

Discography

Studio albums
 Her's Is > [sic] (2001)
 Invention (2002)
 Dreams of Water Themes (2003) 
 The Weather (2003) 
 Rethinking the Weather (2003)
 A Gent Agent (2004)
 Of Snowdonia (2004)
 Exquisite Corpse (2005)
 Denies the Day's Demise (2006)
 Live at Low End Theory (2008)
 Love to Make Music To (2008)
 Bespoke (2011)
 Drown Out (2013)
 The Light Brigade (2014)
 Of Beyond (2014) 
 Kneedelus (2015) 
 Labyrinths (2016)
 Baker's Dozen  (2017)
 Wears House (2017)
 Taut (2018)
 The Bittereinders (2019)
 What Wands Won't Break (2020)
 What Wands Remixes (2020)
 Holy Water Over Sons (2021) 
 Simmers Over (2022)

EPs
 Portrait of the Artist (2001)
 The Quiet Party (2002)
 The Household EP (2003)
 Something Bells (2004)
 Meanwhile... (2004)
 Glass Bottom Boats (2004) 
 Axe Murderation Remixes (2006)
 Throw a Fit (2006)
 Fair Weather Friends (2007)
 Make It So (2008)  
 Touchtone & FWF Remixes (2008)
 Friends of Friends Vol. 1 (2009)  
 Los Angeles 6/10 (2010) 
 Righteous Fists of Harmony (2010)
 Overwhelmed EP  (2011)
 Looking Ocean (2012)
 Pluses (2019)

Singles
 "Dublab presents: Freeways 7inch" (2001) 
 "Hi-Top Fade Parade" b/w "My Petite" (2003) 
 "28:06:42:12" (2004) 
 "Impending Doom" b/w "Just Briefly" (2005) 
 "Sundown" (2006)
 "For Withered Friends" (2008)
 "Make It So" (2008)
 "Hrs:Mins:Secs" (2008)
 "Sounds of Symmetry" (2011) 
 "Tailor-Made" (2011)
 "Ain't No Juke" (2013)
 "Knocking On Adore" (2022)

Guest appearances

 Daedelus - "A Mashnote" from Dublab presents: Freeways (2001)
 Daedelus - "Let's Be Brave" from Advanced Public Listening 01 (2004)
 Daedelus - "All Lights On Stage That Night" from Keepintime (2005)
 Mochipet - "Spring" from Bunnies & Muffins (2009)
 The Gaslamp Killer - "Impulse" from Breakthrough (2010)
 Daedelus - "Morning Melody" from Up Too Early (2017)
 Daedelus - "Brightest Star Tonight" from Road Angel Project, Vol.5 (2021)

Productions
 Prefuse 73 - "Busy Signal" from One Word Extinguisher (2003)
 Ammoncontact - "Super Eagles & Black Stars", "Hu Vibes RE:Invention" from Sounds Like Everything (2003)
 Madvillain - "Accordion" from Madvillainy (2004)
 Ammoncontact - "Dreamy" from One In An Infinity of Ways (2004)
 Busdriver - "Yawning Zeitgeist Intro", "Wormholes", "Befriend the Friendless Friendster", and "Lefty's Lament" from Fear of a Black Tangent (2005)
 Dwight Trible & The Life Force Trio - "Waves Of Infinite Harmony", "Life Force" from Love is the Answer (2005)
 Subtitle - "Shields Up" from Terrain to Roam (2006)
 Shafiq Husayn - "Le'Star" from Shafiq En' A Free Ka (2008)
 Busdriver - "Scoliosis Jones", "Do the Wop", "Happy Insider", and "Fishy Face" from Jhelli Beam (2009)
 Nocando - "Skankophelia" from Jimmy the Lock (2010)
 Busdriver - "Thick Enough" and "Flesh Glove" from Computer Cooties (2010)
 Thirsty Fish - "Ducks Fail" from Watergate (2011)
 Blu - "Hours" and "Annie Hall" (featuring Chop, Brooker T & Tiombe Lockhart) from York (2013)
 Busdriver - "Exploding Slowly" from Electricity Is on Our Side (2018)
 Shrimpnose - "Fall Away (feat. K.Raydio, Bobby Raps, & Daedelus)" from ...And The World Weeps (2019)
 Cyne - "Elephant Rome" from Pretty Dark Things (2019)
 Self Jupiter - "When Some Drama Pops Off" from Sexy Beast (2019)
 Shrimpnose - "Getting Through To You" from Before It's Too Late (2020)
 Lapsung - "Disappearing Platforms" from wORM (2020)
 Attacca Quartet - "Holding Breadth (feat. Daedelus" from Real Life (2021)

Remixes
 Lab Waste - "Get the Signal (Daedelus Remix)" from Zwarte Achtecground (2003)
 The One A.M. Radio - "Under Thunder and Gale (A Black and Blue Sky by Daedelus)" from On the Shore of the Wide World (2005)
 Flying Lotus - "1983 (Daedelus Remix)" from 1983 (2006)
 Busdriver - "Kill Your Employer (Daedelus Remix)" from Kill Your Employer (2006)
 Coldcut - "Man in a Garage (Daedelus Hydraulic Remix)" from Man in a Garage EP (2006)
 Department of Eagles - "Sailing by Night (Daedelus Floats Thru)" from Romo-Goth (2006)
 Savath & Savalas - "Paths in Soft Focus (Daedelus Wishes You The Best Remix)" from History Is Bunk, Pt.1 (2006)
 Cities - "Lounge Act (Daedelus Remix)" from Variations (2006)
 Tunng - "Bricks (Daedelus Remix)" from And Then We Saw Land (2007)
 Ernest Gonzales - "While On Saturn's Rings (Daedelus Remix)" from While On Saturns Rings (2007)
 Lymbyc Systym - "So We Can Sleep (Daedelus Remix)" from Love Your Abuser Remixed (2008)
 zero dB - "Sunshine Lazy (Daedelus Remix)" (2008)
 Yo Gabba Gabba - "Happy (Adventure Time Remix)" from "Episode 106 - Happy" (2008)
 Little Boots - "Earthquakes (Daedelus RMX)" from Earthquakes Remixed (2009)
 John Tejada - "Imbroglio (Daedelus Reads the Definition)" from Reworked Data 95 Volume 1 (2009)
 Debruit - "Pouls (Daedelus Remix)" from Clé De Bras (2009)
 STS9 - "The New Soma (Daedelus Remix)" from Peaceblaster (The New Orleans Make It Right Remixes) (2009)
 Quantic - "Undelievered Letter (Daedelus featuring Computer Jay Remix)" from Tradition in Transition (2010)
 Nosaj Thing - "Coat of Arms (Daedelus Remix)" from Drift Remixed (2010)
 Bilal - "Restart (Daedelus Remix)" from Restart (2010)
 Baths - "♥ (Daedelus' Snorelaxed Remix)" from Cerulean Remixed (2010)
 Emika - "Drop the Other (Daedelus Fragments into a Thousand Little Pieces)" from Ninja Tune XX Vol. 2 (2010)
 LDFD - "Outtacontrol (Daedelus Remix)" from Outtacontrol EP (2011)
 Oorutaichi - "Futurelina (Daedelus Remix)" from Cosmic Coco, Singing for a Billion Imu's Hearty Pi (2011)
 Sepalcure - "Down (Daedelus RMX)" from Love Pressure Remixed (2011)
 Gustav - "Rettet Die Wale (Daedelus' Muddled Mix-Up)" from Pudel Produkte 15 (2011)
 Amon Tobin - "Kokuko Sosho Battle (Daedelus Remix)" from Chaos Theory Remixed (2011)
 Quantic and His Combo Barbaro - "Undelivered Letter (Daedelus Remix)" from Caliventura Remixes (2011)
 Slugabed - "Sex (Daedelus Remix)" from Sex (2012)
 Turn On The Sunlight - "Firefly Night (Daedelus Remix)" from Remixes/Collaborations (2012)
 DJ Krush and Dj Kentaro - "Kikkake (Daedelus Remix)" (2012)
 Open Mike Eagle - "Nightmares (Daedelus Pacifically)" (2012)
 Sunny Levine - "No Other Plans (Daedelus Remix)" from Hush Now (2013)
 Hundred Waters - "Boreal (Daedelus Remix)" (2013)
 Sister Crayon - "Cynic (Daedelus Remix)" (2013)
 Mono/Poly - "Crew (Daedelus' Remix)" from Killer B's (2013)
 Moors - "Gas (Daedelus Remix)" from Moors (2014)
 80kidz - "Dusk (Daedelus Remix)" from Face:Remodel (2015)
 Chapelier Fou - "La Guerre des Nombres (Daedelus "War Of Numbers" remix)" from Fuse (2015)
 Jimmy Pé - "Broken Clock (Daedelus Remix)" from Fake Fantasy EP (2015)
 Bass Sekolah - "Lighthouse (Daedelus Remix)" from Lighthouse Remixed (2015)
 Saul Williams - "Horn of the Clock-Bike (Daedelus' Fugue)" from These Mthrfkrs (2016)
 The Album Leaf - "Back to the Start (Daedelus Remix)" from Between Waves (Deluxe Edition) (2016)
 DJ Shadow - "Mutual Slump (Daedelus Remix)" from Endtroducing... Re-Imagined (2016)
 Kasai Allstars - "Drowning Goat (Daedelus Remix)" from Félicité Remixes (2017)
 Jaw Gems - "Heatweaver (Daedelus Remix)" from Heatweaver Remixes (2017)
 Sonae - "Between Two Worlds (Daedelus Remix)" from Monika Werkstatt Remixes (2017)
 Drum & Lace - "Sunrise (Daedelus Remix)" from Sunrise Remixes (2017)
 Inara George - "A Bridge (Daedelus Remix)" (2018)
 Death Cab For Cutie - "Gold Rush (Daedelus Remix)" (2018)
 Yo Gabba Gabba - "Quest (Daedelus Remix)" from "Episode 411 - Quest" (2018)
 Mild Minds - "Weak Signal (Daedelus' Missed Connections Remix)" from Swim Remixes(2019)
 んoon - "Custard (Daedelus Remix)" from Hoajao (2019)
 Local Natives - "Garden of Elysian (Daedelus Remix)" (2020)
 QRTR - "Nossa (Daedelus Remix)" (2022)
 Jaws That Bite - "Limba (Daedelus Remix)" (2022)
 Tanya Tagaq - "Tongues (Daedelus Remix)" from North Star Remixes (2022)
 Tropics - "Acrylic (Daedelus Remix)" from NTPM300 (2022)

Mixes
 Where the Day Takes You (1998)
 Happily Ever After (2010)
 Boiler Room #66 (2012)
 Lovers Juke Too (2012)
 Fact Mix 331 (2012)
 Exotica (2013)
 Lovers Juke Too, Deux (2016)
 Wears House (2017)

References

External links

 

Living people
1977 births
Musicians from Santa Monica, California
USC Thornton School of Music alumni
American electronic musicians
American hip hop record producers
Anticon artists
Brainfeeder artists
Ninja Tune artists
Plug Research artists
Non-binary musicians